Switzerland competed at the 2018 Winter Paralympics in Pyeongchang, South Korea, held between 9–18 March 2018. They sent a team of 13 participants in 3 sports.

Medalists

Alpine skiing 

Men

Women

Cross-country skiing 

Men's distance

Wheelchair curling

Summary

Round-robin
Switzerland has a bye in draws 2, 4, 6, 9, 14 and 16.

Draw 1
Saturday, 10 March, 14:35

Draw 3
Sunday, 11 March, 9:35

Draw 5
Sunday, 11 March, 19:35

Draw 7
Monday, 12 March, 14:35

Draw 8
Monday, 12 March, 19:35

Draw 10
Tuesday, 13 March, 14:35

Draw 11
Tuesday, 13 March, 19:35

Draw 12
Wednesday, 14 March, 9:35

Draw 13
Wednesday, 14 March, 14:35

Draw 15
Thursday, 15 March, 9:35

Draw 17
Thursday, 15 March, 19:35

See also 
 Switzerland at the 2018 Winter Olympics
 Switzerland at the Paralympics

External links 
 Swiss Paralympic Team 2018

References 

Nations at the 2018 Winter Paralympics
Paralympics
2018